Ava Michelle Cota (born April 10, 2002) is an American actress. She is best known for her role as the character Jodi Kreyman in the Netflix comedies Tall Girl and Tall Girl 2. She made regular appearances in the third to seventh seasons of Dance Moms, as well as being a member of the Select Ensemble team in season four for a short time.

Biography 
Cota was born on April 10, 2002, and was raised in Fenton, Michigan. She attended JC's Broadway Dance Academy which was owned and operated by her mother Jeanette, but closed permanently in 2022. Ava was a guest dancer of the ALDC "Select Team" in season 4 of Dance Moms.

Ava has been trained in contemporary, ballet, pointe, jazz, and tap dance. She is also a model and made her debut on the runway for New York Fashion Week in 2017. In 2018, she launched a social media campaign, #13Reasons4Me, that encourages people to list 13 things they love about themselves or in their lives.

Career 
Cota appeared in 2013 on the television series  Dance Moms  and was a regular on the show for another 4 years. She later toured the United States with other stars from Dance Moms in 2018.  In 2016, she was in the first episode of So You Think You Can Dance: The Next Generation, though she was eventually cut due to her height.

She appeared in several short movies in 2018 and made appearances in two episodes of The Bold and the Beautiful. Her first major role in acting came as playing the lead character in the Netflix film Tall Girl which was first broadcast on September 13, 2019. Michelle began filming of the sequel to the Netflix film Tall Girl in April 2021.

Filmography

Film

Television

References

External links 
 
Ava being picked on because of her body shape during dance rehearsal
So You Think You Can Dance – Ava dancing and talking about being kicked off Dance Moms due to her height
Dance Moms – Ava beats Maddie Ziegler in a nationals dance off
Ava – professional dancer video

2002 births
Living people
21st-century American actresses
Actresses from Michigan
American female dancers
American film actresses
American television actresses
Dancers from Michigan
Female models from Michigan